Passent is a surname. Notable people with the surname include:

 Agata Passent (born 1973), Polish journalist and writer
 Daniel Passent (1938–2022), Polish journalist and writer